Chloé Zhao (born Zhao Ting, 31 March 1982) is a Chinese-born filmmaker.  She is known primarily for her work on independent films. 

Her debut feature film, Songs My Brothers Taught Me (2015), premiered at Sundance Film Festival to critical acclaim and earned a nomination for the Independent Spirit Award for Best First Feature. Her second feature film, The Rider (2017), was critically acclaimed and received nominations for the Independent Spirit Award for Best Film and Best Director.

Zhao garnered international recognition with the western film Nomadland (2020), which won numerous accolades, including the Golden Lion at the Venice Film Festival and the People's Choice Award at the Toronto International Film Festival. Earning four Academy Award nominations for the film, Zhao won Best Picture and Best Director, becoming the second woman and first woman of color to win the latter. She also won awards for directing at the Directors Guild of America Awards, Golden Globe Awards, and British Academy Film Awards, becoming the second female winner of each of them. 

Zhao's latest film is the Marvel Cinematic Universe superhero film Eternals (2021), which she co-wrote and directed.

Early life and education
Zhao Ting was born on 31 March 1982 in Beijing. Her father Zhao Yuji was an executive at Shougang Group, one of the country's largest state-owned steel companies. After amassing significant personal wealth, he later moved on to real-estate development and equity investment. Yuji was tied to a number of offshore companies during the Panama Papers leaks. Zhao's mother was a hospital worker who was in a People's Liberation Army performance troupe.

In an interview with Vogue, Zhao described herself as "a rebellious teen, lazy at school" who drew manga-influenced comics and wrote fan fiction. She loved films growing up, especially Happy Together by Wong Kar-wai. From an early age, Zhao was drawn to influences from Western pop culture. After her parents separated, her father married comic actress Song Dandan, whom Zhao had grown up watching on television.

Although Zhao was still learning English at the time, her parents sent her to Brighton College, a private boarding school in the United Kingdom at the age of 15. She later moved to Los Angeles by herself, living in a Koreatown apartment in 2000, and attended Los Angeles High School. She next attended Mount Holyoke College in Massachusetts, where she majored in politics and minored in film studies, graduating in 2005. Bartending and working odd jobs after graduating helped her realize that she enjoyed meeting people and hearing about their lives and histories, giving her the push to attend film school.  A Vulture article reported that "Four years was enough to turn her off of politics...she found herself drawn more to people than to policy". Following up on her undergraduate film minor, she next joined the Kanbar Institute of Film and Television Graduate Film Program at New York University's Tisch School of the Arts. While attending Tisch, Zhao studied under director Spike Lee She told USA Today that she appreciated Lee not sugarcoating anything, saying that "he will just tell you as it is", something that she claims she needed. After enrolling in the Graduate Studies film program at NYU in 2010 she made her first short film Daughters.

Career

Chloé Zhao's first work is her 2009 short film The Atlas Mountains, the story about Helen Thomas who develops a brief yet passionate relationship with an immigrant worker who comes to fix her computer. She also released a second short film titled Daughters, a film about a 14-year-old girl Maple, living in rural China, who is forced into an arranged marriage and takes a dangerous path trying to break free. This short won First Place Student Live Action Short at the 2010 Palm Springs International Short Fest and Special Jury Prize at the 2010 Cinequest Film Festival.

In 2015, Zhao directed her first feature, Songs My Brothers Taught Me. Shot on location at the Pine Ridge Indian Reservation in South Dakota, the film depicts the relationship between a Lakota Sioux brother and his younger sister. An already existing reservation, the Pine Ridge Indian Reservation has approximately 2.1 million acres, around 46,855 members, and occupies the Oglala Lakota, Jackson, and Bennet counties. In Zhao's film, the brother Johnny plans to leave home and move to Los Angeles with his girlfriend when he graduates high school, but struggles with the thought of leaving his sister Jashaun at home with their troubled mother who is grieving the loss of their father. Focusing on the real lives and struggles of the surrounding community, the film showcases the realness of people and problems they are faced with. In a Filmmaker article, Zhao stated that her rebellious years in her childhood is what pushed her to leave China and study abroad, helping her connect to the plot of the film which focuses on a character struggling in this environment. Half improvised, around 100 hours of footage was collected as Zhao worked with the real residents of the reservation to draw inspiration from their lives and personalities in order to help shape her story. She was able to utilize the natural landscape around her in this film in order to create a place of revelation, where people can be closest to God. Using wide and long shots, she created a documentary-like film that feels authentic, the desolate beauty of the Great Plains creating a story that depicts both freedom and hopelessness. It premiered in 2015 as part of the U.S. Dramatic Competition at Sundance Film Festival. It later played at Cannes Film Festival as part of the Director's Fortnight selection and was nominated for Best First Feature at the 31st Independent Spirit Awards.

In 2017, Zhao directed The Rider, a contemporary western drama, which follows a young cowboy's journey to self-discovery after a near-fatal accident ends his professional riding career. The film was executive produced by her father, Yuji Zhao. As with her first feature, Zhao engaged a cast of non-actors who lived at the filming location, in this case on a ranch. Her inspiration came from Brady Jandreau—a cowboy she had met and befriended on the reservation where she shot her first film—who suffered a severe head injury when thrown from his horse during a rodeo competition. Jandreau would star in the film, playing a fictionalized version of himself as Brady Blackburn. According to an Indiewire article, this film discovers a new side of the Western theme, revolutionary because a Chinese immigrant changed the nation's "oldest genre." The article stated that the film became "the type of film it is because of a man and a woman, because the two of us wanted to work together and understand where we were coming from."

The film premiered at Cannes Film Festival as part of the Directors' Fortnight selection and won the Art Cinema Award. It earned her nominations for Best Feature and Best Director at the 33rd Independent Spirit Awards. At the same ceremony, Zhao became the inaugural winner of the Bonnie Award, named after Bonnie Tiburzi, which recognizes a mid-career female director. The film was released on April 13, 2018, by Sony Pictures Classics and was critically acclaimed. Peter Keough of The Boston Globe wrote: "[The film] achieves what cinema is capable of at its best: It reproduces a world with such acuteness, fidelity, and empathy that it transcends the mundane and touches on the universal."

In 2018, Zhao directed her third feature film, Nomadland, starring Frances McDormand. The adaptation from Jessica Bruder's Nomadland: Surviving America in the Twenty-First Century was shot over four months traveling the American West in an RV with many actual nomadic workers. Bruder's book revolved around characters that can be found in the film, such as Linda May, a 64-year-old living in her van and scrounging for jobs in order to buy land for a permanent home. Other characters, such as Bob Wells, a nomad vlogger of the CheapRVliving YouTube channel and website and in charge of the annual nomad meet-up featured in the film, are real people that Bruder encountered when writing her book and Zhao included in her movie. The film tells the story of a widow who lost everything in The Great Recession and decides to travel in her van across the American Midwest, beginning a journey of self-discovery. Star Frances McDormand and Zhao bonded quickly and inspired each other, and McDormand became a huge element of the filmmaking process and its success. They met a day before the 2018 Independent Spirit Awards, where McDormand was nominated for Best Actress and Zhao received a $50,000 grant for women directors. During the event, they hinted at their future project together. It premiered at the Venice Film Festival, where it received critical acclaim and won the Golden Lion award, and subsequently played at the 2020 Toronto International Film Festival, where it won the People's Choice Award. The film was released on February 19, 2021, by Searchlight Pictures. Zhao won the Golden Globe Award for Best Director for Nomadland, making her the first woman of Asian descent honored, and only the second woman to win a Golden Globe for directing since Barbra Streisand in 1984. In April 2021, Zhao won the Academy Award for Best Director, becoming the second woman to do so (Kathryn Bigelow being the first). The film has not received a theatrical release in China, with speculation that it was due to her past comments on the nation, and news of her Best Director win at the Academy Awards was also censored.

In September 2018, Marvel Studios hired her to direct Eternals, based on the comic book characters of the same name. The film follows the events of the 2019 Marvel movie Avengers: Endgame, featuring a new team of superheroes that must reunite in order to fight an ancient enemy of the human race, the Deviants. Zhao was heavily influenced by Ridley Scott's Prometheus (2012) and Nick Cassavetes' The Notebook (2004) in crafting the MCU film. It was released on November 5, 2021. Zhao is both the director and one of the four writers of the film, the others being Patrick Burleigh, Ryan Firpo, and Kaz Firpo. Eternals received mixed reviews. The New Yorker stated that Zhao's style of directing dialogue scenes "reveals the absurdity of the script," saying "it might as well have been done via green screen, for the little tangibility and texture that it offers the characters and viewers alike." The article also claimed that the film has reportedly been banned in Saudi Arabia and Kuwait due to the relationship between two male characters, Phastos and Ben. In spite of negative reviews, it still made $161.7 million during its opening weekend and became No. 1 at the box office.

On February 15, 2021, Variety reported that with "34 awards season trophies for directing, 13 for screenplay and nine for editing, Chloe Zhao has surpassed Alexander Payne (Sideways) as the most awarded person in a single awards season in the modern era." In 2021, she appeared on the Time 100, Times annual list of the 100 most influential people in the world.

Upcoming projects

In April 2018, it was announced that Amazon Studios greenlit Zhao's untitled Bass Reeves biopic, a historical Western about the first black U.S. Deputy Marshal. Zhao is set to direct the film and write the screenplay. In February 2021, Variety confirmed that Zhao is tackling the classic Universal monster Dracula, as the writer, producer and director of a new take on the character in the vein of a futuristic sci-fi western. In August 2022, actor Patton Oswalt revealed that a sequel to Eternals was in development with Zhao returning to direct. However, later actor Kumail Nanjiani stated that he had not heard anything about a sequel and believed that Oswalt was wrong.

Styles and themes 
Throughout her filmography, Zhao carries relatively the same styles and techniques. The main actress in her film Nomadland, Frances McDormand, told Rolling Stone about Zhao's process, saying "she's basically like a journalist... she gets to know your story, and she creates a character from that" and that she "draws a razor-sharp line between sentiment and sentimentality". A Filmmaker Magazine article quoted Zhao saying "I want to find new ways to place the camera to evoke more of a feeling. My goal is to put the camera inside of [the character]". An example of her process can be found in her newest film, Eternals, when she saw the connection between actors Lauren Ridloff and Barry Keoghan who play Makkari and Druig in the film. The article said Zhao saw them interacting and thought "Okay, we've got to write more moments",  stating "It's the same as I did with Nomadland and The Rider. I would see how they interact and I would write that into the film". She believes that everyone wants to feel a connection, that filmmakers tell their stories because they don't want to feel alone, which is why she focuses on the themes of authenticity and places an emphasis on real stories.

Influences 
Zhao cites Wong Kar-wai's romance Happy Together as the "film that made me want to make films". She was also influenced by Spike Lee, who was her film professor while she studied at New York University's Tisch School of the Arts. She cited Ang Lee as an influence as well, saying, "Ang Lee's career has been very inspiring to me — how he's able to bring where he comes from to all the films that he makes". She also has mentioned Werner Herzog and Terrence Malick as key influences.

Zhao stated her earliest introductions to American cinema were The Terminator, Ghost and Sister Act.

Censorship in China

After Zhao became the second woman to win a Golden Globe Award for Best Director (for Nomadland), many Chinese viewers, as well as state media in China, celebrated her win and "sought to claim Zhao's glory for China". Shortly afterward, however, some Chinese internet users began to question Zhao's citizenship and debated "whether it is appropriate to claim Zhao's victory as China's", with Variety calling the claim "a common move by state-backed outlets to drum up nationalism". Much of the controversy hinged around two sets of remarks: a 2013 Filmmaker magazine interview in which Zhao described China as "a place where there are lies everywhere", and a late 2020 interview in which Zhao was mis-quoted as saying "The US is now my country" (she had actually said "The US is not my country," and the error was corrected about two months later). References to Zhao in Chinese media were censored following her Oscar win.

Personal life 
Zhao now resides in the Topatopa Mountains in Ojai, California with three chickens, Red, Cebe, and Lucille and two dogs, Taco and Rooster and her partner and cinematographer, Joshua James Richards. Richards and Zhao met while Zhao was researching for her first feature film Songs My Brother Taught Me and Richards was still a film student at NYU. He has been her cinematographer for her next two films and served as camera operator on Marvel's Eternals. In an Elle article, Richards stated that Zhao was "gnarly and extreme", someone he wanted to find at film school.

Filmography
Short films

Feature films

Awards and nominations

Daughters (2010) won First Place Student Live Action Short at the 2010 Palm Springs International Short Fest and Special Jury Prize at the 2010 Cinequest Film Festival. In 2021 Zhao's Nomadland (2020) won the Academy Award for Best Picture and the Acadamy Award for Best Directing. Nomadland (2020) also won Golden Globe's Award for Best Director, the BAFTA Award for Best Direction, the BAFTA Award for Best Film, the Independent Spirit Award for Best Director, the Independent Spirit Award for Best Editing, the Critic's Choice Movie Award for Best Adapted Screenplay as well as the Critic's Choice Movie Award for Best Director.

Notes

References

External links

 
 

1982 births
21st-century Chinese women writers
21st-century Chinese writers
Best Directing Academy Award winners
Best Director BAFTA Award winners
Best Director Golden Globe winners
Chinese film editors
Chinese film producers
Chinese women film directors
Chinese women film producers
Chinese women screenwriters
Directors Guild of America Award winners
Directors of Golden Lion winners
English-language film directors
Film directors from Beijing
Filmmakers who won the Best Film BAFTA Award
Golden Globe Award-winning producers
High School Affiliated to Renmin University of China alumni
Independent Spirit Award for Best Director winners
Living people
Mount Holyoke College alumni
People from Ojai, California
People's Republic of China emigrants to the United States
Producers who won the Best Picture Academy Award
Screenwriters from Beijing
Tisch School of the Arts alumni
Film controversies in China
Film censorship in China